Elsie Ivancich Dunin (born July 19, 1935) is a  dance ethnologist (ethnochoreologist), choreographer, professor and author specializing in folk dance from Croatia, Macedonia, and Romani (Gypsies) in Macedonia. Her studies focus on Croatian diaspora communities and associated sword dances in both Old and New World contexts. She is Professor Emerita of dance ethnology from the University of California at Los Angeles (UCLA) and is currently a dance research advisor with the Institute of Ethnology and Folklore Research in Zagreb, Croatia. Her two daughters are Teresa (T.J.) and Elonka Dunin.

Cross-Cultural Dance Resources Collection
Dunin is also a leading member of Cross-Cultural Dance Resources, (CCDR) a non-profit organization dedicated to the study of dance ethnology. Founded in 1981, the CCDR has amassed a collection of over 15,000 books, manuscripts, personal papers, costumes, films and instruments. In April 2008, Dunin, who serves on the organization's board, made a gift to Herberger College of the Arts to provide for the collection's permanent care and curation.

Awards 
In 2006, Dunin was awarded the "Outstanding Leadership in Dance Research" award by Congress on Research in Dance (CORD)

Books 
 Folk dances, 1969, ASIN B0007FZ1DO
 Gypsy wedding, dance and customs, 1971, ASIN: B0007C5K9C
 Yugoslav dance: An introduction and list of sources available in United States libraries, 1981, 
 Dance Occasions and Festive Dress in Yugoslavia, 1984, 
 Starobosansko kolo in Yugoslavia and in California, 1988, 
 DdA reference format for dance, 1989, ASIN: B0006F2EJ4
 Orata vo Makedonija: Scenski del : Tanec, 1995, 
 (editor) Dance And Society: Dancer as a Cultural Performer (European Folklore Institute Bibliotheca Traditionis Europae), 2005,

References

 East L.A. Gazette, May 8, 1949
 Redlands Daily, May 5, 1949

External links
 Slavonijo Dance Ensemble - Elsie Dunin, dance ethnologist
 The Society for Ethnomusicology
 International Council for Traditional Music
 Cross-Cultural Dance Resources - Elsie Dunin's current field research

American female dancers
American dancers
Living people
University of California, Los Angeles faculty
American people of Croatian descent
Dance writers
1935 births
Ethnochoreologist
21st-century American women